The 2010–11 Albany Great Danes men's basketball team represented the University at Albany in the 2010–11 NCAA Division I men's basketball season. They finished the season 16–16 overall, 9–7 in America East play to finish in a tie for fourth place.

Roster

Incoming signees

Coaches

Schedule and results

|-
!colspan=12 style=|Regular season

|-
!colspan=12 style=}| America East tournament

References

Albany
Albany Great Danes men's basketball seasons
Albany Great Danes
Albany Great Danes